The 1962–63 Spartan League season was the 45th in the history of Spartan League. The league consisted of 16 teams.

League table

The division featured 16 teams, 14 from last season and 2 new teams:
 Cheshunt, from Aetolian League
 Chalfont St. Peter, from London League

References

1962-63
9